The 2017 NCAA Division I FCS football season, part of college football in the United States, was organized by the National Collegiate Athletic Association (NCAA) at the Division I Football Championship Subdivision (FCS) level. The FCS Championship Game was played on January 6, 2018, in Frisco, Texas. The North Dakota State Bison beat the James Madison Dukes, 17–13, to capture their sixth title in seven years.

Conference changes and new programs

Membership changes

In addition, this was the final year for Campbell in the Pioneer Football League. In November 2016, the school announced that it would transition to scholarship football, and would add the sport to its existing membership in the Big South Conference in 2018.

This was the final season for Idaho as a football member of the Sun Belt Conference, and was also Idaho's final FBS season. Following the 2016 decision of the Sun Belt not to extend its football membership agreements with Idaho after their 2017 expiration, Idaho announced that it would downgrade to FCS football, adding the sport to its full but non-football membership in the Big Sky Conference. This is the first time in Division I that a school has voluntarily descended from FBS to FCS.

It was also the final season for Liberty in the Big South, and also potentially the final season for Hampton in Mid-Eastern Athletic Conference (MEAC) football (see below).

Other headlines

Offseason
 January 26 – The Missouri Valley Football Conference announced that North Dakota would join the league in 2020. The school's other sports, except for men's ice hockey, will move from the Big Sky Conference to the non-football Summit League in 2018, but the football team will remain a Big Sky member until 2020.
 February 16 – Liberty announced plans to undergo the two-year transition period join the Division I FBS as a football independent, while remaining in the Big South Conference in all other sports. While normally against NCAA rules to transition to FBS without a conference invite, Liberty was granted a waiver. Liberty will join FBS in 2018, but will not become a full member and eligible for post-season play until 2019.
 April 14 – The NCAA Division I Council approved a suite of rule changes affecting the recruiting process. The changes most significant to FCS football were:
 Effective with the 2017–18 school year, a national early signing period for high school players was to be introduced, at a time in December to be announced later.
 Effective with the 2017–18 recruiting season, FCS programs no longer have any restriction on the number of new players that may be signed to letters of intent or financial aid agreements. Previously, FCS teams were limited to signing 30 new players per year.
 May 8 – The Collegiate Commissioners Association, which controls the letter of intent program, approved the recruiting changes approved last month by the Division I Council. The early signing period for high schoolers was fixed as the first three days of the midyear signing period for junior college players; in 2017, this window fell on December 20–22.

Season
 November 15 – The Big South Conference announced that Hampton would leave the MEAC and join the Big South effective with the 2017–18 school year. While Hampton will join the Big South in non-football sports at that time, it had not yet been determined whether Hampton football would begin Big South play in 2018 or 2019.
 November 20 – The Pioneer Football League and Presbyterian College jointly announced that the Presbyterian football team would immediately start a transition to non-scholarship football. PC football will leave the Big South after the 2019 season, play the 2020 season as an FCS independent, and join the Pioneer League in 2021.

Kickoff games
Guardian Credit Union FCS Kickoff (aka Montgomery Kickoff Classic)
Jacksonville State defeated Chattanooga 27–13 at the Cramton Bowl (Montgomery, Alabama) on August 26.
Other Week Zero games:
FBS opponent BYU defeated Portland State 20–6 at home on August 26.
Colgate traveled to Cal Poly August 26, coming away as 20–14 winners.
Florida A&M hosted Texas Southern on August 26, winning 29–7.

New stadiums
 East Tennessee State defeated Division II Limestone 31–10 in the opener for William B. Greene Jr. Stadium on September 2. The team had played its first two seasons since reinstating football at local high school venue Kermit Tipton Stadium.
 Abilene Christian opened Anthony Field at Wildcat Stadium on September 16 with a 24–3 win over Houston Baptist, following 57 seasons at Shotwell Stadium.

FCS team wins over FBS teams
(FCS rankings from the STATS poll)
August 31:
 Tennessee State 17, Georgia State 10
September 2:
 Howard 43, UNLV 40
 No. 1 James Madison 34, East Carolina 14
 Liberty 48, Baylor 45
September 9:
 No. 12 New Hampshire 22, Georgia Southern 12
 South Dakota 35, Bowling Green 27
September 16:
 Idaho State 30, Nevada 28
 No. 25 North Carolina A&T 35, Charlotte 31
September 23:
 No. 19 Western Illinois 52, Coastal Carolina 10

Conference standings

Conference summaries

Championship games

Other conference winners
Note: Records are regular-season only, and do not include playoff games.

Playoff qualifiers

Automatic berths for conference champions

At large qualifiers

Abstentions
Ivy League – Yale
Mid-Eastern Athletic Conference – North Carolina A&T
Southwestern Athletic Conference – Grambling State

Postseason

NCAA Division I playoff bracket

* Home team    WinnerAll times in Eastern Standard Time (UTC−05:00)

Bowl games

Awards and honors

Walter Payton Award
The Walter Payton Award is given to the year's most outstanding offensive player. Finalists:
 Jeremiah Briscoe (QB), Sam Houston State
 Keelan Doss (WR), UC Davis
 Chris Streveler (QB), South Dakota

Buck Buchanan Award
The Buck Buchanan Award is given to the year's most outstanding defensive player. Finalists:
 Andrew Ankrah (DE), James Madison
 Darius Jackson (DE), Jacksonville State
 Brett Taylor (LB), Western Illinois

Jerry Rice Award
The Jerry Rice Award is given to the year's most outstanding freshman.
 Winner: Bryson Armstrong (LB), Kennesaw State

Coaches
AFCA Coach of the Year: Brian Bohannon, Kennesaw State
Eddie Robinson Award: Will Healy, Austin Peay

Coaching changes

In-season
This is restricted to coaching changes that took place on or after May 1, 2017. For coaching changes that occurred earlier in 2017, see 2016 NCAA Division I FCS end-of-season coaching changes.

End of season

See also
 2017 NCAA Division I FCS football rankings
 2017 NCAA Division I FBS football season
 2017 NCAA Division II football season
 2017 NCAA Division III football season
 2017 NAIA football season

References